Bradley Joseph Bubb (born 30 May 1988) is a former professional footballer who played as a striker. Born in England, he represented Grenada at international level. Besides England, he has played in Belgium.

Club career
Born in Harrow, Bubb spent his early career with Hendon and Queens Park Rangers. Bubb later played non-league football for Chalfont St Peter, Beaconsfield SYCOB and Farnborough. He moved to Aldershot Town on 6 June 2011, signing a two-year contract. He made his debut for Aldershot on 13 August 2011, in the Football League.

On Monday 9 January 2012, following the expiration of his loan at Conference South side Basingstoke Town, Bubb joined another Conference South side, Eastleigh, on loan for the rest of the season. Bubb won the Conference South Player of the Month award in February 2012.

He also spent a loan spell at Woking, and after leaving Aldershot, played in Belgium for Royal Antwerp. He then re-signed for Aldershot in January 2014, before being released at the end of the season. He then signed for Havant & Waterlooville, netting 11 times in 44 appearances, and Oxford City in June 2015.

On 23 June 2016, Bubb joined National League South side Ebbsfleet United on a one-year deal.

On 23 February 2018, he signed for National League South side Wealdstone on an 18-month deal. He made his debut the following day in Wealdstone's FA Trophy quarter final away to Billericay Town, where he scored a hat trick in a 5–2 win. Bubb scored a total of 12 goals before leaving the club.

International career
Bubb made his international debut for Grenada on 26 November 2010.

Personal life
Bubb is the younger brother of Byron Bubb, and cousin to Alvin Bubb.

References

1988 births
Living people
English sportspeople of Grenadian descent
Grenadian footballers
English footballers
Footballers from Harrow, London
Association football forwards
Grenada international footballers
2011 CONCACAF Gold Cup players
English Football League players
National League (English football) players
Challenger Pro League players
Hendon F.C. players
Queens Park Rangers F.C. players
Chalfont St Peter A.F.C. players
Beaconsfield Town F.C. players
Farnborough F.C. players
Aldershot Town F.C. players
Basingstoke Town F.C. players
Eastleigh F.C. players
Woking F.C. players
Havant & Waterlooville F.C. players
Oxford City F.C. players
Wealdstone F.C. players
Ebbsfleet United F.C. players
Royal Antwerp F.C. players
Grenadian expatriate footballers
Grenadian expatriate sportspeople in Belgium
Expatriate footballers in Belgium